Lifetrack Therapy, founded by the Japanese Keio educated and Harvard trained psychiatrist Dr. Yukio Ishizuka, is a new personality model and therapy based on universal spheres of psychological health. Ishizuka's willingness to learn from his patients, as well as his exposure to the East, He draws from the principles of both Zen Buddhism and quantum mechanics in his method of treatment.

Ishizuka developed Lifetrack therapy, an approach and methodology to help his patients experience psychological health.

Lifetrack Therapy : positive mental health
Lifetrack Therapy, is Ishizuka's clinical positive mental health approach developed and tested since 1975. The new paradigm of health includes:

 a full personality model that withstands the demanding criteria for mental health models set forth by Marie Jahoda
 a hierarchy of defense which is mobilized when one's past experience and current capability to cope are exceeded by life challenges 
 a clinical approach that focuses on ‘closeness’ with a spouse or comparable partner for fundamental personality change 
 the use of crisis as an opportunity to  transform self, intimacy and achievement far beyond a previous best level of experience 
 a method of therapy Lifetrack, that defines, measures and enhances well-being as the central objective
 clinical insights  on self-actualization and fear, breakthrough intimacy, and stages of personality transformation under crisis

Lifetrack theory: three basic psychological needs for psychological health or self-actualization

In 1975, Dr. Ishizuka hypothesized that three basic psychological spheres determine psychological health and self-actualization across cultures.
Those three spheres are: the search for self, the need for intimacy, and the quest for achievement.  Also referred to as the "triad of psychological adjustment" or "tripod of happiness"  the three spheres are subjective, dynamic, and broad enough to encompass all psychological events.  These three interconnected spheres characterize a person's personality.  A prolonged imbalance or a crisis in any one of these three key interconnected spheres of health influences the others and can trigger defensive symptoms such as anxiety, anger, physical symptoms, depression or in some cases psychosis. The tripod model of health is the basis for Lifetrack Therapy, a clinical approach drawing on the experience and insights accumulated by the daily self-rating data of more than 1,200 patients throughout their treatment on 41 parameters of mental health through periods of crisis to optimal health.  The central goal for both the ‘distressed” and the “well” in Lifetrack Therapy is the same: well-being in the primary three spheres of life.  Therapy sessions are focused on using crisis as an opportunity to transform the three spheres far beyond a previous best level of experience.

Methods

 Definition of Positive Mental Health
Lifetrack therapy uses a structured definition of positive mental health or wellness state as the central objective of therapy.  Keeping the needs of his patients in mind, where Ishizuka understood the subjective response to life events to be a cause of human suffering, he hypothesized that there may be subjective spheres of life which contribute to happiness or suffering more than others.  By defining three subjective spheres that contribute to well-being, Ishizuka provides a conceptual framework for positive mental health.  Ishizuka's definition of the three spheres includes a breakdown of each sphere into three dimensions with nine elements each (a total of 27 parameters).  States of well-being (peace, friendliness, physical wellbeing, happiness and mastery), stress (anxiety, anger, physical symptoms, depression and psychosis), physical health, and correct substance are also defined by the model contributing to a total of 41 positive mental health parameters.

 Quantification of Positive Mental Health
For an individual to become happier or to grow in a short period of time there needs to be a means for him or her to actively think, feel and act in ways that foster positive mental health.  In the experience of Lifetrack, the ability to improve the subjective world far beyond a previous best requires an active focus of one's mental states throughout therapy.   Ishizuka has found that using simple definitions of positive mental health as the objective of therapy and a subjective 10 point rating scale, one can track subjective responses to life events.  For example, if you depend on your spouse or significant other at only a 5 on a 10-point scale, that implies that you can think, feel and act in ways that allow you to more graciously depend." With his patients taking five to ten minutes daily to track self, intimacy and achievement spheres, as well as positive peaks of well-being (peace, friendliness, physical-health, happiness, mastery), negative peaks (anxiety, anger, physical symptoms, depression, psychosis), physical health, and proper use of food, beverage, or other substances, focus on incremental thinking, feeling and acting is encouraged.  In therapy, Ishizuka actively uses setbacks as a means to promote growth in the three spheres.  Together, the therapist and the patient use the definition of positive mental health and the subjective daily rating of the patient in 41 mental health parameters to focus weekly therapy sessions on overcoming setbacks and building health beyond a previous best level of adjustment.

Background for methodology
The new methodology was inspired by Ishizuka's background in medicine and business, and from the needs of his patients.  Although the quantification of positive mental health has limitations,
Ishizuka points out that similar limitations may exist in quantum mechanics in that the observer influences what he is observing, and that the mind can only experience one aspect of a phenomenon at a specific point in time.

Limits of the methodology
According to Ishizuka,  the subjective experience of happiness, well-being, depression and the like cannot be adequately or fully described but only experienced by each individual.  Since this is the case we should be aware of limits in attempting to define, quantify or track well-being or happiness.  Despite that happiness and depression are not steady states, but can change from one moment to the next, Ishizuka's experience shows that repetitive self assessments according to the same fixed model yield highly valuable information. In this sense, individual self ratings in Lifetrack on one health parameter are much like a droplet in the fountain of our psychological experience. These droplets when viewed individually or in isolation may not tell us much. However, when a person uses the same model to track psychological health consistently over time, the collection of droplets accumulate creating patterns, much like the shape of a fountain.

The goal in positive mental health is not to compare psychological health or well-being between two or more individuals or to decide who is healthy and who sick, but to build and strengthen psychological health within the same individual over a period of time.  In this respect, psychiatry has much to learn from physics.  The physicist Finkelstein was also aware on how “experience” in the exact science of physics cannot be fully communicated to others.  However, the physicist argued that if we can show how to make the experience happen and show how to measure it, then we can help others to have it. This is precisely what has been done in Lifetrack therapy.

Lifetrack Therapy

The objective of therapy is positive mental health or well-being
The central goal for both the ‘distressed” and the “well” in Lifetrack Therapy is the same: health and well-being in the primary spheres of life.  The focus of therapy is optimal psychological health in the three spheres, rather than the immediate elimination of distressing symptoms.  Efforts are focused in therapy sessions on improving the three spheres far beyond a previous best level of experience.  Therapy terminates when one has successfully established and sustained new and better balanced patterns of coping in all three spheres, not when symptoms such as depression initially decrease or disappear.

Duration or length of therapy
While the scale for inner health has no optimal limit, under optimal conditions in Lifetrack therapy (one person in the couple is in sufficient distress, there is an effective therapist who can work with both, and the ‘well’ partner is willing to help), a complete transformation of personality, or breakthrough in the self, intimacy, and achievement spheres far beyond a previous best level, may be achieved in 3–6 months.

Tools in Lifetrack Therapy
In Lifetrack therapy the therapist interprets the graphs of the patient's subjective self-rating in weekly therapy sessions on a computer screen (daily when the patient is in the hospital or otherwise require intensive therapy).  The active role of the therapist and a patient data tracking system that measures, tracks and focuses growth in one's self, intimacy and achievement spheres, helps place setbacks or crisis into proper perspective.  Visualizing both breakthroughs and setbacks with the therapist in key areas that constitutes positive mental health has become an important tool and component of Lifetrack therapy leading to the following insights on the mind:

Clinical findings

The accumulated evidence of daily self-rating data of more than 1,200 patients throughout their treatment on 41 parameters of health include:

 Self-actualization and fear

Even when individuals desire to build inner health (self, intimacy and achievement), due to fear, they can think, feel, and act in a contrary fashion. Such fear is found in all individuals, healthy or ‘diseased’ to varying degrees and can be triggered when a previous best level of adjustment is surpassed by the challenge one faces.  For therapists and patients, understanding the nature of this fear, and predicting it ahead of time, is critical to overcoming it.  An effective Lifetrack therapist reminds the patient that the very progress he is making provokes setbacks, and that each setback opens the way to further breakthrough and advance.

 Breakthrough intimacy

Of the three spheres, Ishizuka has found that intimacy is the most central to health and also the most important conduit for fundamental personality transformation through therapy.  According to Ishizuka, within the intimacy sphere, the adult couple relationship is far more important than even the best therapeutic one.  More than an analysis of the past parent-child relationship or a lengthy dependence on a therapist, the couple relationship allows the individual to give and receive love, overcoming fear that may have arisen through a difficult past, failed adult relationships, fear of the unknown, or even ‘isolated’ setbacks in the achievement or self sphere that have seemingly nothing to do with intimacy.  In short, intimacy is a conduit to rapid and dramatic inner growth.  Even when the initial problem manifests itself in the form of a crisis in the achievement  or self sphere, successful Lifetrack therapy for adults always focuses on making a breakthrough in intimacy first.  This is due to the primary role that intimacy plays in human growth as well as its importance in sustaining a personality under distress (when the self and achievement spheres have collapsed).  In the safe context of Lifetrack therapy, couples learn to overcome defensive symptoms on both sides.  The objective is to attain a much higher level of intimacy where defenses such as anxiety, anger, physical symptoms, depression or psychosis recede and allow positive peaks of peace, friendliness, physical wellbeing, happiness and mastery to become dominant.

 Trade-offs in psychological spheres and four stages of transformation

In successful Lifetrack therapy, where the individual emerges far beyond a previous best level of adjustment in his sense of self, intimacy and achievement, four stages of transformation have been observed. These four stages are the path of personality transformation (or growth) through crisis.  The primary instigator of inner growth is the intimacy sphere in stages I and II.  Self and achievement catch up to intimacy in stage III and stabilize and continue to advance together at much higher levels than a previous best experience in stage IV.

Positive mental health: integrating health and ‘disease’

Ishizuka's personality model, the Lifetrack model, fulfils all six conditions for measuring health by Jahoda while also integrating an understanding of ‘disease.’  Used and tested by patients who experience profound psychological distress as well as optimal health in their self, intimacy and achievement spheres, the Lifetrack model constitutes a new paradigm in health and as well as new form of clinical therapy.

Limitations of Lifetrack Therapy

Lifetrack uses little to no drugs and considers medication, for the most part, as symptom relief.   Hence, the Lifetrack model in the current context of psychiatry that focuses on drug treatment, and allots little time to psychotherapy may not be ideally conducive to practice Lifetrack Therapy.  While psychologists, social workers, marital counsellors and coaches trained in ‘talking cures’ may also be particularly effective with Lifetrack Therapy, due to strong defensive reactions (anxiety, anger, physical symptoms, depression, psychosis) that can be triggered in a minority of highly defensive individuals, psychiatrists trained in this therapy are advised to work with social workers and psychologists to help deal with all possible contingencies, including the use of medication and possible hospitalizations.

Another limitation to the new paradigm of health is that little academic literature or clinical teaching exists on the model (the book Self-Actualization is in Japanese). Ishizuka continues to give precedence to his patients and breaking clinical ground in therapy, over publishing, research, teaching or the dissemination of his ideas in academia.  For English therapists interested in Lifetrack therapy, Ishizuka has presented at the APA  (American Psychiatric Association Annual Meeting) and other world congresses, and has several professional publications in English including Lifetrack Therapy, Intimacy and Stress: Effective Therapeutic Intervention, Causes of Anxiety and Depression in Marriage, and Conjoint Therapy for Marital Problems, Divorce: Can and Should it be prevented?  While the online tracking of health parameters is available for therapists and patients through Lifetrack.com and is systematically presented through cases for therapists in an eBook for therapists; Breakthrough Intimacy – Sad to Happy Through Closeness, or compared to other approaches such as Maslow, Murray, Freud and others on Positive Mental Health Foundation, these teaching materials give preference to those familiar with online technologies.  For Lifetrack to spread, additional clinical teaching or academic literature may be useful.

Future of positive mental health, clinical models, applications

The Lifetrack model incorporates both an understanding of disease and optimal health.  Lifetrack defines, measures, and tracks positive mental health and provides a clinical method useful to patients to improve psychological well-being.  With humanistic models of man, such as the Lifetrack model, which integrate both optimal health and disease in the same model, psychiatrists and clinical psychologists can help individuals develop and maintain health as the objective of therapy while addressing inevitable crisis and inner growth.  Just as positive psychology can inform clinical psychology, clinical models in psychiatry based on health may also inform the field of psychology, including positive psychology, known to study Maslow, Rogers, Fromm, and Murray.

The Lifetrack model, based on an understanding of psychological health and healthy human beings, can have implications on other fields such as conflict negotiation (Harvard's Program of Negotiation) or any field that makes simple assumptions about human beings such as transaction cost economics (Oliver Williamson, 2009 Nobel Laureate).  With models of man that integrate both an understanding of health and disease, we are better suited to go beyond the field of psychology and apply insights from the “normal” functioning of the mind to political science, economics, international affairs, nations and organizations.

References

External links 
 Positive Mental Health Foundation
 Lifetrack

Psychotherapies